The Mozambique Grand Prix or Grand Prix de Moçambique, was an open-wheel motor race held in the 1950s and 60s in Lourenço Marques (now Maputo) the capital of the colony of Portuguese Mozambique.

A race was held on a small street circuit in 1950 with the Grand Prix being established some eight years later. The circuit was expanded in 1961 before being replaced by a purpose built facility in 1962.

Competitors were drawn from the South African Formula One Championship, although it was never part of the championship. The more northerly climate and international location to the South African and Rhodesian racers proved a popular combination and the race attracted strong fields. The race was briefly renamed the Governor General Cup in 1966– 1967 before returning to the Grand Prix.

The circuit was redeveloped and moved slightly inland from its beachfront location in 1970. The race was last held in 1971 as the Portuguese Colonial War grew more serious and the circuit closed a year later after the last Three hour sportscar race was held. The new independent Mozambique government banned motor racing and the race track fell into disuse.

Winners of the Mozambique Grand Prix 
Results sourced from:

References 

Formula One non-championship races
Grand Prix
National Grands Prix
Mozambique
Mozambique Grand Prix
Recurring sporting events established in 1958